Greatest Days is a jukebox musical with music and lyrics by Take That and a book by Tim Firth. It received its world premiere under its original title The Band at the Manchester Opera House, in September 2017, before embarking on a UK and Ireland tour and opened at the Theatre Royal Haymarket at London's West End in December 2018. The band was cast through the 2017 BBC reality television show Let It Shine.

The musical tells the story of four women who were best friends as teenagers and all big fans of The Band. 25 years later after losing contact the four of them reunite to fulfill their dream of seeing the band perform.

Greatest Days is the second jukebox musical based on the songs of Take That, after the 2008 musical Never Forget.

Productions

UK and Ireland tour and West End (2017 - 2019) 
The musical premiered as The Band at the Manchester Opera House on 26 September 2017 (previewing from 8 September) before touring the rest of the UK and Ireland until March 2019.

The musical made its West End premiere at the Theatre Royal Haymarket for a limited run from 1 December 2018 to 12 January 2019, including a charity gala opening night on 4 December 2018.

Germany (2019) 
The musical made its premiere at the Theater des Westens in Berlin for a limited run from 11 April 2019 to September 2019, followed by a run in Munich from 11 October 2019 to 3 November 2019.

UK and Ireland tour (2023 - 2024) 
A new production using the musical's new title Greatest Days will open at the Churchill Theatre, Bromley from 5 May 2023 before touring until 2024 to coincide with the release of the movie adaptation (due for release in summer 2023) and the 30th anniversary of Take That's first ever no. 1 UK single Pray.

P&O Arvia (2023 - 2027) 
In August 2022 it was announced that a special adaptation of Greatest Days would be performed exclusively onboard new P&O Ship Arvia. The show had its premiere on Monday 9th of January 2023. It was directed by James Robert Moore, with choreography by Ian West, musical direction by Roxanna Shirley, arrangements by Steve Parry, set design by Steve Howell, costume by Carry On Costumes, sound design by Leigh Davies and video and lighting design by Ben Bull.

Cast UK and Ireland

Cast Germany

Cast P&O Arvia

Film adaptation 

A film adaptation titled Greatest Days featuring a screenplay by Firth and directed by Coky Giedroyc with choreography by Drew McOnie is due for release in summer 2023.

References

External links

Instagram Channel for German programme

2017 musicals
Jukebox musicals
Take That
West End musicals